Eliphalet Trask (January 8, 1806 – December 9, 1890) was an American politician who served as the third Mayor of Springfield, Massachusetts, and as the 23rd Lieutenant Governor for the Commonwealth of Massachusetts from 1858 to 1861. In 1855 Trask was elected the Mayor of Springfield, Massachusetts, on the Know Nothing party ticket.

References

External links
New York Times obituary

1806 births
1890 deaths
Massachusetts Republicans
Massachusetts Whigs
19th-century American politicians
Mayors of Springfield, Massachusetts
Members of the Massachusetts House of Representatives
Lieutenant Governors of Massachusetts
Springfield, Massachusetts City Council members
Massachusetts Know Nothings